Micronola irani is a moth of the family Erebidae first described by Michael Fibiger in 2011. It is found in the mountains of western and southern Iran. The habitat consists of open Artemisia steppe.

The wingspan is 7–9 mm. The head, patagia and thorax are dark grey brown. The forewing ground colour (including fringes) is grey brown. The crosslines are black, outlined in beige. The subterminal and terminal lines are indistinct or absent. The hindwings are grey. The underside is unicolorous grey without a discal spot on the hindwing. The abdomen is grey.

References

Micronoctuini
Taxa named by Michael Fibiger
Moths described in 2011